Major General John Kirk Singlaub (July 10, 1921 – January 29, 2022) was a major general in the United States Army, founding member of the Central Intelligence Agency (CIA), and a highly decorated officer in the former Office of Strategic Services (OSS).

In 1977, Singlaub was relieved from his position as Chief of Staff of U.S. forces in South Korea after criticizing President Jimmy Carter's proposal to withdraw U.S. troops from the Korean peninsula in an interview with the Washington Post. Less than a year later, Singlaub was forced to retire after publicly questioning President Carter's national security policies. In 1979, Singlaub founded the Western Goals Foundation, a private intelligence network that was implicated for supplying weapons to the Contras during the Iran–Contra affair. Singlaub contributed to several books and wrote an autobiography.

Biography
Singlaub was born in Independence, California, on July 10, 1921. After graduating from Van Nuys High School in 1939, he attended the University of California, Los Angeles, but abandoned his studies in 1943 to begin military service.  (In 1958 he  completed the Bachelor of Arts in political science at UCLA.) With the United States  entering World War II, Singlaub joined the U.S. Army and commissioned as a second lieutenant on January 14, 1943. Deployed to Europe for special operations, Singlaub was dropped behind German lines in France in August 1944, as part of Operation Jedburgh. As a member of a three-member team (codenamed "JAMES"), he worked with  Maquis groups that swelled the ranks of the French Resistance after D-Day.

In 1945, Singlaub was redeployed to the Pacific. On August 27, before the formal Japanese surrender, he parachuted onto Hainan Island, China, commanding an eight-member team, to arrange the evacuation of US, Australian and Dutch prisoners of war being held there. Singlaub demanded proper food and medical care for the POWs, who the Japanese were still treating as prisoners.

Singlaub headed CIA operations in postwar Manchuria during the Chinese Communist revolution, led troops in the Korean War, managed the secret war along the Ho Chi Minh trail in the Kingdom of Laos and Vietnam, worked with the Contras in Nicaragua, and Afghan resistance during the Soviet invasion of Afghanistan. He graduated from the Army Command and General Staff College in 1954 and the Air War College in 1960. Because of the increasing use of helicopters in Special Forces operations, he decided to attend flight school at Fort Rucker as a fifty-year-old brigadier general in 1971.

In 1977, while Singlaub was chief of staff of U.S. forces in South Korea, he publicly criticized President Jimmy Carter's proposal to withdraw U.S. troops from the Korean peninsula. On March 21, 1977, Carter relieved him of duty for overstepping his bounds and failing to respect the President's authority as Commander-in-Chief.  Less than a year later, Singlaub again publicly questioned President Carter's national security policies, this time during a lecture at Georgia Tech, and was forced to retire on June 1, 1978. The U.S. Army Special Operations Command presented its first John Singlaub Award in 2016 for "courageous actions ... off the battlefield."

After retiring from the army, Singlaub, with John Rees and Democratic Congressman from Georgia, Larry McDonald founded the Western Goals Foundation. According to The Associated Press, it was intended to "blunt subversion, terrorism, and communism" by filling the gap "created by the disbanding of the House Un-American Activities Committee". Prior to the collapse of the Berlin Wall and Marxism–Leninism in the Soviet Union in 1991, Singlaub was founder in 1981 of the United States Council for World Freedom, the U.S. chapter of the World Anti-Communist League (WACL). The chapter became involved with the Iran–Contra affair, with Associated Press reporting that, "Singlaub's private group became the public cover for the White House operation". The WACL was described by former member Geoffrey Stewart-Smith as allegedly a "largely a collection of Nazis, Fascists, anti-Semites, sellers of forgeries, vicious racialists, and corrupt self-seekers." Singlaub is credited with purging the organization of these types and making it respectable.

U.S. Army General William Westmoreland described Singlaub as a "true military professional" and "a man of honest, patriotic conviction and courage." Congressman Henry J. Hyde (Judiciary, Foreign Affairs, and Intelligence Committees), described Singlaub as "a brave man, a thorough patriot, and a keen observer"; someone who had been "in the center of almost every controversial military action since World War II." Active for 40 years in overt and covert operations, he had private and secret interviews with many military and government leaders worldwide. He personally knew William Casey, Director of Central Intelligence during the Reagan Administration, as well as Oliver North, and was involved in the Iran–Contra affair. Singlaub was President Reagan's administrative chief liaison in the Contra supply effort to oppose Moscow's and Fidel Castro's advances in El Salvador and Nicaragua during the Cold War and their support for armed Marxist revolutionary guerrilla movements. Through his chairmanship of the world Anti-Communist League (WACL) and its U.S. chapter, the U.S. Council for World Freedom (USCWF), he enlisted Members of the US Congress from both political parties, Washington, D.C. policymakers, retired U.S. military officials, paramilitary groups, foreign governments, and American think tanks and conservatives in the Contra cause.  He often met on Capitol Hill with members of the U.S. Congress, including Congressman Charlie Wilson (D-TX) about U.S. support and funding for the Contras and anti-communist resistance forces in Afghanistan opposed to the Red Army invasion of Kabul in 1979.

As of 2014, he lived in Franklin, Tennessee. He was a member of the advisory council of the Victims of Communism Memorial Foundation. Singlaub was the honorary vice president of London's Special Forces Club. He was the chairman of The Jedburgh Group and president of the non-profit organization America's Future, Inc. In January 2020 Singlaub used the "America's Future" of Phyllis Schlafly to plead with Attorney General William Barr to "free Mike Flynn, drop the charges".

He turned 100 in July 2021, and died on January 29, 2022.

Coalition to Salute America's Heroes
The Coalition to Salute America's Heroes, which was founded by Roger Chapin, named Singlaub to its board of directors in 2008. Singlaub was paid $180,000 by the charity from 2009 to 2011. The New York Times critiqued the organization as a money-maker for its founders rather than for veterans, described it as an "intolerable fraud" and "among a dozen military-related charities given a grade of F in a study last December by the American Institute of Philanthropy, a nonprofit watchdog group. These and other charities have collected hundreds of millions of dollars from kind-hearted Americans and squandered an unconscionable amount of it on overhead and expenses — 70 percent or 80 percent, or more." The Attorney General of California sued the charity in August 2012 for "more than $4.3 million regarding allegations of fraudulent fundraising, self-dealing and excessive executive compensation." The lawsuit was settled in September 2013. According to the charity's 2013 federal tax return, Singlaub resigned from its board of directors in January 2013.

Awards
During his military service, Singlaub was awarded the Distinguished Service Medal with oak leaf cluster, the Silver Star, the Legion of Merit with two oak leaf clusters, the Bronze Star with oak leaf cluster, the Air Medal with oak leaf cluster, the Army Commendation Medal, and the Purple Heart. His foreign decorations include the French Croix de Guerre with Palm and Bronze Star devices, British Mention in Dispatches oak leaf, as well as decorations from the Republic of China, the Netherlands, and South Vietnam.

Personal awards
   Combat Infantryman Badge
  Ranger Tab
  Master Parachutist Badge
   Army Distinguished Service Medal with oak leaf cluster
   Silver Star
   Legion of Merit with three oak leaf clusters
   Soldier's Medal
   Bronze Star with oak leaf cluster
   Air Medal with oak leaf cluster
   Army Commendation Medal
   Purple Heart with oak leaf cluster
   American Campaign Medal
   European–African–Middle Eastern Campaign Medal with arrowhead and campaign star
   Asiatic–Pacific Campaign Medal with two campaign stars
   World War II Victory Medal
   National Defense Service Medal with star
   Korean Service Medal with four campaign stars
   Vietnam Service Medal
   Croix de Guerre with palm and bronze star (France)
   Mentioned in Dispatches (United Kingdom)
   Order of the Cloud and Banner (Republic of China)
   Order of Orange-Nassau (Netherlands)
   National Order of Vietnam
   Air Service Medal (Vietnam)
   Navy Service Medal (Vietnam) 
   United Nations Korea Medal
   Republic of Vietnam Campaign Medal
   Korean War Service Medal (Republic of Korea)

Unit awards
   Air Force Outstanding Unit Award
   Gallantry Cross Unit Award (Vietnam)

Singlaub was inducted into the U.S. Army Ranger Hall of Fame in 2006. He was made a Distinguished Member of the Special Forces Regiment in 2007.

Published works
 Hazardous Duty. Summit Books, 1991.  (Autobiography with Malcolm McConnell).

References

External links

 
 Major General John Singlaub, The International Skydiving Hall of Fame

1921 births
2022 deaths
People from Inyo County, California
University of California, Los Angeles alumni
Military personnel from California
United States Army personnel of World War II
United States Army personnel of the Korean War
United States Army Command and General Staff College alumni
United States Army aviators
Air War College alumni
United States Army personnel of the Vietnam War
American anti-communists
American spies
People of the Office of Strategic Services
United States Army Rangers
Recipients of the Air Medal
Recipients of the Croix de Guerre (France)
Recipients of the National Order of Vietnam
Recipients of the Silver Star
Recipients of the Soldier's Medal
Recipients of the Legion of Merit
United States Army generals
Recipients of the Distinguished Service Medal (US Army)
People from Franklin, Tennessee
Writers from California
Men centenarians
American centenarians